Émile Fortin (18 February 1878 – 18 May 1936) was a Conservative member of the House of Commons of Canada. He was born in Lévis, Quebec, and became a pharmacist and physician.

Fortin, a graduate of Université Laval, was a member of the Medical Society of Quebec.

He was first elected to Parliament at the Lévis riding in the 1930 general election after a previous unsuccessful campaign there in the 1926 federal election.

He was appointed to the Senate for the De la Durantaye, Quebec, division on 14 August 1935 but remained in that role for less than a year, until his death at a Quebec City hospital on 18 May 1936. He had been ill with pneumonia since that March and his condition worsened with a subsequent heart attack.

References

External links
 

1878 births
1936 deaths
Members of the House of Commons of Canada from Quebec
Conservative Party of Canada (1867–1942) MPs
Canadian pharmacists
Canadian senators from Quebec
Université Laval alumni
Deaths from pneumonia in Quebec
People from Lévis, Quebec
Physicians from Quebec